Geoffrey Donald Chisholm  (8 September 1929 – 13 January 2006) was an Australian politician.

He was born in Smithton, Tasmania. In 1964, he was elected to the Tasmanian House of Assembly as a Labor member for Braddon. He was Chair of Committees from 1972 to 1974 and a minister from 1974 until his retirement in 1979. He was appointed a Member of the Order of Australia in 1992. His son-in-law, Michael Polley, is also a state Labor politician.

Chisholm died in his sleep, aged 76, at his home in Devonport on 13 January 2006.

References

1929 births
2006 deaths
Members of the Tasmanian House of Assembly
Members of the Order of Australia
Australian Labor Party members of the Parliament of Tasmania
20th-century Australian politicians